The Three Buttes,  el. , are buttes or small, flat-topped hills northwest of Lodge Pole, Montana in Blaine County, Montana.

See also
 List of mountain ranges in Montana

Notes

Landforms of Blaine County, Montana
Buttes of Montana